Saros cycle series 105 for lunar eclipses occurred at the moon's descending node, repeating every 18 years 11 and 1/3 days. It contained 73 events between 566 August 16 and 1864 October 15.

This lunar saros was linked to Solar Saros 112.

List

See also 
 List of lunar eclipses
 List of Saros series for lunar eclipses

Notes

External links 
 www.hermit.org: Saros 105

Lunar saros series